Viviane Forest (born 14 May 1979) is a Canadian multi-sport Paralympic medallist. She was born and raised in Quebec, and currently resides in Edmonton, Alberta.

Sporting career
Forest played on Canada's gold medal-winning goalball teams in Sydney and Athens.

She won a silver at the 2010 Winter Paralympics in Vancouver for slalom (Visually Impaired), with a time of 2:01.45, 0.89 seconds behind the winner, Sabine Gasteiger of Austria.

She won a bronze in the 2010 Winter Paralympics for giant slalom for women's visually impaired.

She won gold at the 2010 Winter Paralympics in Whistler Creekside for Women's Visually Impaired Downhill. This made her the first para-athlete to win a gold in both the Winter and Summer Games.

Her skiing guide is Lindsay Debou. Their personal sponsors are The Weather Network and Fischer.

Results

Beyond the Paralympics, her results include:

2009 World IPC Championships-High 1 Korea
 Gold Medalist- Super-Combined
 Silver Medalist- Downhill
 Silver Medalist- Giant Slalom
 Silver Medalist- Slalom
 Silver Medalist- SG

2009 World Cup Finals-Whistler, BC 
 Gold Medalist- Giant Slalom
 Gold Medalist- Downhill
 Silver Medalist- Super combined
 Silver Medalist- Super G

References

External links
 Viviane Forest: Going for Gold, official website
 Viviane and Lindsay 2010, partially archived official site
 Canadian Paralympic Committee profile

1979 births
Living people
Canadian female alpine skiers
Female goalball players
Paralympic goalball players of Canada
Goalball players at the 2000 Summer Paralympics
Goalball players at the 2004 Summer Paralympics
Paralympic alpine skiers of Canada
Alpine skiers at the 2010 Winter Paralympics
Paralympic gold medalists for Canada
Paralympic silver medalists for Canada
Visually impaired category Paralympic competitors
Medalists at the 2000 Summer Paralympics
Medalists at the 2004 Summer Paralympics
Medalists at the 2010 Winter Paralympics
Articles containing video clips
Paralympic medalists in alpine skiing
Canadian blind people